Boneh-ye Hoseyn Kaluli (also Romanized as Boneh-ye Ḩoseyn Kalūlī, Boneh Hoseinkalooli, and Boneh Ḩoseyn Kolūlī) is a village in Mahur Berenji Rural District, Sardasht District, Dezful County, Khuzestan Province, Iran. At the 2006 census, its population was 1,941, in 378 families.

References 

Populated places in Dezful County